Abhimanyu is a 1948 Tamil-language film produced by Jupiter Pictures and starring S. M. Kumaresan as Abhimanyu, a character from the Mahabharatha. The screenplay was written by A. S. A. Sami, while M. Karunanidhi assisted in the script. This was the second film for Karunanidhi as scriptwriter. The film also starred M. N. Nambiar in a supporting role.

Plot 

The film tells the story of the Pandava prince Abhimanyu.

Cast 

Male cast
 S. M. Kumaresan as Abhimanyu
 P. V. Narasimha Bharathi as Krishnan
 S. V. Subbaiah as Shakuni
 M. G. Ramachandar as Arjunan
 M. N. Nambiar as Lakkanan
 D. Balasubramaniam as Duryodhanan
 Pulimoottai T. R. Ramasami as Ghatorkachan
 M. G. Chakrapani as Balarama
 N. S. Narayana Pillai as Dronar

Male cast (Continued)
 M. K. Mustafa as Karnan
 T. M. Ramasami Pillai as Jankilimama
 Nat Annaji Rao as Vidurar
 K. Ramasami as Surapuli
 S. A. Natarajan as Jayadrathan
 B. Rajagopala Iyer as Dharumar
 N. Shankaramoorthi as Aravan
 T. D. Srinivasan as Dushathanan

Female cast
 U. R. Jeevarathnam as Vathsala
 M. R. Santhanalakshmi as Subhadra
 R. Malathi as Rukmani
 C. K. Saraswathi as Revathi
 M. S. S. Bhagyam as Magic Girl
 K. S. Angamuthu as Rioter
 K. Lakshmikantha as Magic Girl Dancer

Production 
Jupiter Pictures, a production company promoted by M. Somasundaram and S. K. Mohideen shifted to Madras from Coimbatore in 1948 after acquiring Neptune Studios. In 1948 they produced  Abhimanyu, a mythological tale from the epic Mahabharatha at Madras. During the 1930s and the 40s Tamil films were mostly based on when mythologicals, folktales, folk myths and socially themed films were rare. Somasundaram himself directed the film along with A. Kasilingam. The script was written by A. S. A Sami and M. Karunanidhi. This was the second film for Karunanidhi as script writer after Rajakumaari (1947). M. G. Ramachandran and M. N. Nambiar played supporting roles in the film. The film's music was composed by S. M. Subbaiah and C. R. Subbaraman. S. S. Rajendran was cast in the title role, but was relieved after only two weeks of shooting from the film as T. K. Muthusamy of the TKS Brothers drama troupe revealed that Rajendran was still under contract with them, and threatened legal action if the film continued production. Thus the role went to newcomer S. M. Kumaresan.

Soundtrack 
The music was composed by S. M. Subbaiah Naidu and C. R. Subburaman while the lyrics were penned by Papanasam Sivan, T. K. Sundara Vadhyar and Bhoomi Baalagadas. Singers are U. R. Jeevarathinam, M. R. Santhanalakshmi and Friend Ramasamy. Playback singers are Thiruchi Loganathan, M. M. Mariappa and K. V. Janaki.

Release and reception 
Abhimanyu was released on 6 May 1948.

References

External links 

1948 films
1940s Tamil-language films
Films based on the Mahabharata
Indian black-and-white films
Films scored by S. M. Subbaiah Naidu
Films scored by C. R. Subbaraman
Jupiter Pictures films